

Allagash Brewing Company is a brewery in Portland, Maine. The brewery specializes in Belgian style beers.

History
The brewery was founded in 1995 by Rob Tod in Portland, Maine. He observed that while both German and British style beers were available throughout the United States, Belgian-style beers were difficult to find. He established a small, 15-barrel brewery, and began brewing a beer modeled after a Belgian Wit beer, named Allagash White. The beer gets its flavor from the use of wheat in place of barley, as well as the addition of Curaçao orange peel, coriander, and other spices.

All of the beers Allagash produces are bottle conditioned.  The technique calls for two fermentations, the first in the fermenting tanks and the second in the bottle itself (a process known as the methode champenoise). A coolship is used to cool the wort for some of the beers. Allagash was one of the first breweries in the US to build a traditional coolship for spontaneous fermentation by wild yeasts.

Before the beer is bottled, a small amount of yeast and sugar is added and a second fermentation occurs. It is this second fermentation which produces a notable increase in carbonation, a softer feel and remarkable complexity. This method of bottle conditioning leaves a small amount of yeast in the bottle.

Brands
Today, Allagash has eight year-round beers in its portfolio, seven yearly releases, and numerous one-offs and keg-only releases.

Year-Round Beers 
North Sky: Belgian-style stout
House: Brewed in the style of a traditional of Belgian house
Fine Acre: Organic Golden Ale
Tripel: Belgian-style Tripel
White: Belgian-style witbier
Curieux: Belgian Tripel aged in bourbon barrels for seven weeks
Sixteen Counties: brewed with all Maine-grown grains including: Maine Malt House 2-row Malted Barley from Buck Farms, Blue Ox Malthouse 2-row Malted Barley, raw wheat from Maine Grains, and oats from Aurora Mills & Farm.
River Trip: Dry-hopped Belgian-style table beer brewed with coriander

See also
 Beer in the United States
 Barrel-aged beer

References

External links
 Official website

Beer brewing companies based in Maine
Companies established in 1995